Gullfaxi is a horse in Norse mythology. Its name means "Golden mane".

It was originally owned by Hrungnir, and was later given to Magni by Thor as a reward for lifting off the leg of Hrungnir, which lay over the unconscious Thor and strangled him:
'And I will give thee,' he said, 'the horse Gold-Mane, which Hrungnir possessed.'

Then Odin spake and said that Thor did wrong to give the good horse to the son of a giantess, and not to his father.
—Skáldskaparmál (17)

Gullfaxi is equally fast on land, in the air and on the water, but not quite as fast as Sleipnir, Odin's horse.

Folk tale

See also
Guldfaxe (glacier)
 List of fictional horses

References

Horses in Norse mythology
Horses in mythology
Thor